The Keta Sandlanders are a Ghanaian association football club and co-operative founded in 2002 and based in Keta, Ghana. They are competing in the GAFCOA.

References

External links
Keta Sandlanders Club Website

Football clubs in Ghana
Association football clubs established in 2002
2002 establishments in Ghana
Volta Region